Jurujuba is a promontory and one of the 48 administrative districts into which the city of Niterói, Rio de Janeiro in Brazil is divided. It lies in the southern zone of the city, on the coast of the Guanabara Bay.

Neighbourhoods of Niterói